The Rock Band series of music video games supports downloadable songs for the Xbox 360, PlayStation 3, and Wii versions through the consoles' respective online services. Users can download songs on a track-by-track basis, with many of the tracks also offered as part of a "song pack" or complete album at a discounted rate. These packs are available for the Wii only on Rock Band 3. Most downloadable songs are playable within every game mode, including the Band World Tour career mode. All downloadable songs released before October 26, 2010 are cross-compatible between Rock Band, Rock Band 2 and Rock Band 3, while those after only work with Rock Band 3.  Certain songs deemed "suitable for all ages" by Harmonix are also available for use in Lego Rock Band.

The Wii version of Rock Band does not support downloadable content, but Rock Band 2 and Rock Band 3 do, with DLC first made available in January 2009. Songs from the back catalogue of downloadable content were released for the Wii weekly in an effort by Harmonix to provide Wii players with every previously available song.

Following the release of Rock Band 4 for the PlayStation 4 and Xbox One, all previously purchased downloadable content for Rock Band 3 and earlier is forward compatible (with the exception of any downloadable content purchased for The Beatles: Rock Band) within the same system family at no additional cost.

Over 300 songs were released for Rock Band in 2008, including 9 full albums. Screaming for Vengeance by Judas Priest was the first available Rock Band album, released on April 22. The self-titled debut album by The Cars and Doolittle by Pixies were released in the succeeding months. Though developer Harmonix had previously announced that the album Who's Next by The Who would be among the first downloadable albums for Rock Band, this never came to fruition. Instead, a 12-song compilation pack titled "The Best of the Who (Rock Band Edition)" was released on July 15.

List of songs released in 2008
The following songs have been released for the Rock Band games in the year 2008. All songs available in packs are also available as individual song downloads on the same date, unless otherwise noted. Dates listed are the initial release of songs on Xbox Live. Starting May 20, 2008, all downloadable songs are available in both the North American and European markets, unless noted.

Some songs released before Rock Band 3 have been retrofitted to include Rock Band 3 features, including backing vocals, and the ability to buy an additional pack for Pro Guitar/Bass charts without having to buy the "RB3 Version" of the song.  Certain songs have been marked "family friendly" by Harmonix; such songs released before Rock Band 3s launch on October 26, 2010 can be played in Lego Rock Band.

Starting October 26 (with The Doors), all new songs are only playable in Rock Band 3, due to a change in the file format. All songs released via downloadable content are playable in Rock Band 3, and support its new Pro Drum mode.  Most songs released for Rock Band 3 include core features for keyboards, Pro Keyboards, and backing vocals in the core song, where they are appropriate. Additionally, some of these songs features charts for Pro Guitar and Bass that can also be purchased.

Promotions

Following the release of Rock Band, Harmonix and EA began to form partnerships with different companies and bands to provide promotional content.

 Harmonix Pack 01 was first released as part of a bonus disc included with the February 2008 issue of Official Xbox Magazine.
 "Inside the Fire" and "Indestructible" (from Disturbed Pack 01) were offered at no cost in June 2008 to customers who preordered the band's album Indestructible through Best Buy's online store.
 Crüe Fest Pack 01 was handed out as a prize in Stride's Rock Band Off, held in June 2008.
 On November 6, 2008 Harmonix began distributing 20 free downloadable songs to owners of Rock Band 2 for the Xbox 360 and PlayStation 3. The song pack could only be downloaded after redeeming a code printed inside the game's manual. These songs were released to the Wii as free downloads on January 13, 2009, and could be found in the Rock Band Music Store. Harmonix has made no announcement regarding plans to release these songs through the Music Store for the 360 or PS3. This content is playable in both Rock Band and Rock Band 2 for the 360 and PS3. Wii owners can only use this content in Rock Band 2.

References

External links

 Official Rock Band series song list - Additional information for all songs featured in the Rock Band series.

Rock Band 2008
Downloadable 2008
2008 in video gaming